Carey is a village in Wyandot County, Ohio, United States. The population was 3,507 at the 2019 census.

History
The village is near Sheriden Cave, where habitation occurred around 11,000BC.
The village of Carey was founded in 1843 when William M. Buell and R. M. Shuler laid out the town on land that they owned.  The town was named after Judge John Carey, an early prominent resident.

Geography
Carey is located at  (40.951978, -83.381673).

Demographics

2010 census
As of the census of 2010, there were 3,674 people, 1,521 households, and 983 families living in the village. The racial makeup of the village was 96.2% White, 0.2% African American, 0.2% Native American, 1.6% Asian, 0.7% from other races, and 1.0% from two or more races. Hispanic or Latino of any race were 2.0% of the population.

There were 1,521 households, of which 34.7% had children under the age of 18 living with them, 44.8% were married couples living together, 13.8% had a female householder with no husband present, 6.0% had a male householder with no wife present, and 35.4% were non-families. 31.1% of all households were made up of individuals, and 11.9% had someone living alone who was 65 years of age or older. The average household size was 2.41 and the average family size was 2.99.

The median age in the village was 37.1 years. 26.4% of residents were under the age of 18; 8.2% were between the ages of 18 and 24; 25.4% were from 25 to 44; 27% were from 45 to 64; and 13% were 65 years of age or older. The gender makeup of the village was 49.3% male and 50.7% female.

2000 census
As of the census of 2000, there were 3,901 people, 1,543 households, and 1,023 families living in the village. The population density was 1,977.6 people per square mile (764.6/km2). There were 1,607 housing units at an average density of 814.6 per square mile (315.0/km2). The racial makeup of the village was 96.41% White, 0.15% African American, 0.10% Native American, 1.74% Asian, 0.85% from other races, and 0.74% from two or more races. Hispanic or Latino of any race were 1.38% of the population.

There were 1,543 households, out of which 33.2% had children under the age of 18 living with them, 47.6% were married couples living together, 13.2% had a female householder with no husband present, and 33.7% were non-families. 29.9% of all households were made up of individuals, and 12.3% had someone living alone who was 65 years of age or older. The average household size was 2.49 and the average family size was 3.07.

In the village, the population was spread out, with 26.9% under the age of 18, 9.9% from 18 to 24, 28.6% from 25 to 44, 20.2% from 45 to 64, and 14.4% who were 65 years of age or older. The median age was 34 years. For every 100 females there were 93.3 males. For every 100 females age 18 and over, there were 90.6 males.

The median income for a household in the village was $33,116, and the median income for a family was $40,921. Males had a median income of $30,938 versus $22,123 for females. The per capita income for the village was $15,309. About 4.6% of families and 8.6% of the population were below the poverty line, including 8.5% of those under age 18 and 9.2% of those age 65 or over.

Education
Carey Public Schools are part of the Carey Exempted Village School District. There is one elementary school, one high school, and one Catholic School (Our Lady of Consolation) in the district. Students attend Carey High School.  The school mascot is the Blue Devil. Carey High School (CHS) offers many athletic teams such as football, basketball, track, cross country, volleyball, softball, baseball and wrestling.

Carey has a lending library, the Dorcas Carey Public Library.

Government
Carey is served by a mayor and a six-member village council. The mayor and council members are elected for four-year terms, with elections every two years. Two council members are elected in the same cycle as the mayor; the remaining four council members are elected in alternate election years. Carey's current mayor, Jennifer Rathburn, is a lifelong resident of the village who was elected in 2017 after previous stints as interim mayor and council president.

Railroads
Carey and its limestone quarries are served by CSX Transportation along the former Chesapeake and Ohio north to southeast line and by the Wheeling and Lake Erie on the eastern segment of the former Akron, Canton and Youngstown track. The AC&Y's line originally went through town and to the west through Bluffton and its terminus in Delphos before that section was abandoned. A railroad depot located in downtown Carey originally owned by the Mad River and Lake Erie Railroad (later merged into the New York Central) still stands and now serves as a senior citizen center.

The village once hosted the Carey Short Line.

Religion
Carey is predominantly Roman Catholic. The Basilica and National Shrine of Our Lady of Consolation can be found here. There is an annual gathering of Catholics, mainly from the Middle East, who come from around the country on the Feast of the Assumption of Mary. During this gathering, chanting can be heard even from across town, and thousands of people camp in public parks and empty lots to attend the religious procession.

Carey's Catholic community is served by several radio stations. 
WJTA 88.9 FM "Holy Family Radio" licensed to Glandorf and transmitting from Leipsic (which can be heard on a regular FM car radio between Ottawa and Findlay) in addition to a simulcast for Carey and vicinity on WOHA at 94.9 FM in Ada and on an FM translator (W204CU) in Findlay at 88.7 FM.
WSJG-LP 103.3 FM "St. John Paul The Great Radio" located to the northeast in Tiffin
WVSG 820 AM. "St. Gabriel Radio" in Columbus. (the former WOSU (AM) which can be heard best during daytime hours in Carey and vicinity).
 WNOC "Annunciation Radio" 89.7 FM licensed to Bowling Green and based in Toledo which can be heard in certain areas north of Carey.

All stations mentioned above air programming from EWTN Global Catholic Radio in addition to online audiostreaming.

Notable people
 John Carey, US Congressman who lived and died in Carey. The town was named after him.
 Don Wedge, NFL and Collegiate Official

References

External links
 Village website

Villages in Wyandot County, Ohio
Villages in Ohio
1843 establishments in Ohio